Halilabad (also Romanized as Halīlābād; also known as ‘Alīlābād, Jalīlābād, and Khillabad) is a village in Golabar Rural District, in the Central District of Ijrud County, Zanjan Province, Iran. At the 2006 census, its population was 674, in 171 families.

References 

Populated places in Ijrud County